Jarl Magnus Riiber (born 15 October 1997) is a Norwegian nordic combined skier who has been competing since 2014.

Career
Riiber attained his first World Cup podium during the 2014–15 season on 16 January 2015 in Seefeld in Austria. 

During the 2015–16, he won his first race on 6 February 2016 in Oslo, Norway.

Riiber has won the Nordic Combined World Cup four times. He has the all-time most individual World Cup race wins at 53.

Record

Olympic Games

World Championship

World Cup results

Season standings

Podiums

External links
 
 

1997 births
Living people
Skiers from Oslo
Norwegian male Nordic combined skiers
Nordic combined skiers at the 2018 Winter Olympics
Nordic combined skiers at the 2022 Winter Olympics
Olympic Nordic combined skiers of Norway
Olympic silver medalists for Norway
Olympic medalists in Nordic combined
Medalists at the 2018 Winter Olympics
FIS Nordic World Ski Championships medalists in Nordic combined
21st-century Norwegian people